Frederick James Heldreich (born 12 September 2001) is an English cricketer. He made his Twenty20 debut on 23 June 2021, for Northamptonshire in the 2021 t20 Blast.

Heldreich was raised in Debenham before moving to Badingham, and attended Framlingham College. He spent a few months in the winter of 2020–21 at the Darren Lehmann Cricket Academy in Adelaide. He made his List A debut on 25 July 2021, for Northamptonshire  in the 2021 Royal London One-Day Cup.

References

External links
 

2001 births
Living people
English cricketers
Northamptonshire cricketers
Cricketers from Ipswich
Suffolk cricketers